Shields of Power is a fantasy role-playing game published by Shield Maiden in 1990.

Contents
Shields of Power is a fantasy role-playing game with a random character generation process for race, class, and family background. In addition to rules for combat and skill resolution, the book contains an introductory adventure, "Gold Quest."

Publication history
Shield Maiden published Shields of Power in 1990, a 94-page book designed by Dee Ann Nichols, with illustrations by Nichols and Trevor Wirth. Nichols subsequently published a number of editions of the rules, as well as separate adventures that use the Shields of Power rules.

Reviews
White Wolf #25 (Feb./March, 1991)

References

Fantasy role-playing games
Role-playing games introduced in 1990